Joseph Szydlowski (originally Józef Szydłowski; November 21, 1896, Skryhiczyn (in Chełm County, Poland), – July 16, 1988 in Israel), was a Polish-Israeli aircraft engine designer who founded Turbomeca in France.

Biography and career 
At the time of Szydlowski's birth Chełm was part of Lublin Governorate in the Russian Empire. He was taken prisoner by the German Empire during World War I. He started working in Germany and applied for his first patents in 1920. With the rise of Nazism he emigrated to France in 1930. During the 1930s, he designed an unusual supercharger compressor which was used by the Hispano-Suiza 12Y in the Dewoitine D.520 fighter. It utilized an axial compressor rather than the usual centrifugal compressor that was predominant at the time in aircraft engines. He founded Turbomeca in Paris in 1938 and built the company on licensed production during World War II. In June 1940, when Germany invaded France he evacuated his company to Saint-Pé-de-Bigorre in southern France. Once the war was over he developed small turbine engines for helicopters. Turbomeca became a major supplier of helicopter turboshaft engines, providing 30% of the non-United States market according to the company.

After the Six-day war, in response to Charles De Gaulle's embargo on Israel, Szydlowski established a factory for the production of jet engines, Beit Shemesh motors, in Israel.

In 1984, Szydlowski received an honorary PhD from the Technion.

References
Biography of Joseph Szydlowski

1896 births
1988 deaths
Polish aerospace engineers
Jews from the Russian Empire
20th-century French inventors
French people of Polish-Jewish descent
20th-century Israeli inventors
Jet engine pioneers
20th-century Polish inventors